Abasa Aremeyaw (born 15 August 2003) is a Ghanaian professional footballer. His primary position is centre-back, and with his height, he has an impact in set pieces in addition to possessing speed and agility.

Club career

Early years
Aremeyaw began his youth career with Žilina Africa, a Ghana-based affiliate club of Žilina of the Slovak Fortuna Liga.

Žilina 
Aremeyaw joined Žilina in September 2021, initially playing for the club's under-18 and under-19 youth teams. Shortly thereafter, he was promoted to Žilina B, which was playing in the Slovak second division, the 2. liga. Aremeyaw made his debut for Žilina B on 18 September 2021 in a 1–0 victory over Humenné. He played 7 games that season for Žilina's reserve side.

On 30 November 2021, Aremeyaw made his Fortuna Liga debut for Žilina as a substitute in a 2–2 draw against Senica.

Aremeyaw also made six appearances for Žilina's under-19 team that competed in the UEFA Youth League in the 2021–22 edition of the tournament. He played every minute of each match, playing a role in helping the team reach the round of 16, falling to eventual finalists Red Bull Salzburg in a penalty shoot-out.

Philadelphia Union
On 4 August 2022, Amereyaw signed for the Philadelphia Union of Major League Soccer on a contract until 31 December 2024, with a club option for an additional two years. He took up an international slot in the team's roster. He and Philadelphia mutually agreed to terminate his contract with the club on 8 February 2023.

References

External links
 MŠK Žilina official club profile 
 
 Futbalnet profile 
 
 Philadelphia Union profile

2003 births
Living people
Ghanaian footballers
Ghanaian expatriate footballers
Association football defenders
MŠK Žilina Africa F.C. players
MŠK Žilina players
Slovak Super Liga players
2. Liga (Slovakia) players
Expatriate footballers in Slovakia
Ghanaian expatriate sportspeople in Slovakia
MŠK Žilina Africa players
Philadelphia Union players
Ghanaian expatriate sportspeople in the United States
Expatriate soccer players in the United States